Lake Brownwood is a reservoir on Jim Ned Creek and Pecan Bayou in Brown County, Texas, United States. After a devastating flood in 1900, the citizens of Brown County created the Brown County Water Improvement District by election in 1926. The water district acquired the land necessary and built a dam to impound the waters of Pecan Bayou at its confluence with Jim Ned Creek. Dam construction started in 1930 and was completed in 1933. A large flood filled the reservoir in July 1932 but the water was released to complete construction of the dam. Deliberate impoundment of the reservoir began in July 1933. The town of Lake Brownwood, Texas formed, and the Texas Parks Board acquired land for Lake Brownwood State Park in 1933.

Lake Brownwood contains two named islands, both located towards the northern half of the lake: Goat Island and McCartney Island.

References

External links

Reservoirs in Texas
Bodies of water of Brown County, Texas